The 2004–05 Danish Superliga season was the 15th season of the Danish Superliga league championship, governed by the Danish Football Association. It took place from 24 July 2004 to 19 June 2005.

The Danish champions qualified for 2005–06 UEFA Champions League qualifying rounds and the 2005–06 Royal League. The runners-up qualified for 2005–06 UEFA Cup qualifying rounds and Royal League, while the 3rd and 4th placed teams qualified for Royal League. The 11th and 12th-placed teams were relegated to the 1st Division. The 1st Division champions and runners-up were promoted to the Superliga.

Table

Results

Top goal scorers

See also
 2004-05 in Danish football

External links
  Netsuperligaen.dk (unofficial site)

Danish Superliga seasons
1
Denmark